This is a list of the National Register of Historic Places listings in Lassen Volcanic National Park.

This is intended to be a complete list of the properties and districts on the National Register of Historic Places in Lassen Volcanic National Park, California, United States.  The locations of National Register properties and districts for which the latitude and longitude coordinates are included below, may be seen in a Google map.

There are 13 properties and districts listed on the National Register in the park.

Current listings 

|}

See also 
 National Register of Historic Places listings in Lassen County, California
 National Register of Historic Places listings in Plumas County, California
 National Register of Historic Places listings in Shasta County, California
 National Register of Historic Places listings in Tehama County, California
 National Register of Historic Places listings in California

References 
Emmons, Ann; Catton, Ted. National Register of Historic Places Multiple Property Documentation Form: Lassen Volcanic National Park Multiple Property Listing. National Park Service February 2004 

Lassen Volcanic National Park